Bakreswar Thermal Power Plant Township is an industrial township in Suri I block in Suri Sadar subdivision of Birbhum district in the Indian state of West Bengal

Geography

Location
Bakreshwar Thermal Power Station, along with the industrial township, are spread across parts of Suri I and Dubrajpur blocks. Small villages, such as Bangaon and Sadaipur, are located in the area. Larger villages, such as Chinpai  and Kachujor, are located nearby.

Police station
Sadaipur police station has jurisdiction over Suri I block.

Neel Nirjan
The reservoir, formed by erecting a dam in the Bakreshwar River, named Neel Nirjan (meaning blue solitude), for providing water to the thermal power plant, is gaining in popularity as a tourist spot.{It can be seen on the map alongside, but it is not marked.)

Economy
The 1,050 MW Bakreshwar Thermal Power Station of West Bengal Power Development Corporation Limited, was commissioned between 1999 and 2009.

Transport
NH 14 (old numbering NH 60), running from Moregram (in Murshidabad district) to Kharagpur (in Paschim Medinipur district), passes through the area. The portion of the highway passing through this area was earlier known as Panagarh-Morgram Highway

The Andal-Sainthia branch line passes through this area. There are stations at Chinpai and Kachujor.

Education
BKTPP Prabir Sengupta Vidyalaya is a co-ed higher secondary school located in the township. Established in 1997, the school follows the course curricula of West Bengal Board of Secondary Education (WBBSE) and West Bengal Council of Higher Secondary Education (WBCHSE) for Standard 10th and 12th Board examinations respectively.

About 
This school is currently managed by the Department of Education. Located near the municipality Suri, this co-educational school consists of grades from 5 to 12. Both Bengali and English are used as the medium of instruction. This school has two rooms for non-teaching activities and a separate room for Head master. It has the faculties of drinking pure water, separate toilet for boys and girls and electric connection. Besides, it  has a large playground, a library with 1500 books, a computer lab and separate lab for all subjects. It has a attached primary section, where classes from Nursery to IV are taught.

Notable students 

 Soukarya Biswas (9th ranked in 2019 Madhyamik Pariksha)
 Soumasis Das (International rank holder in NSTSE and ITHO exam, a test conducted by the Science Olympiad Foundation or SOF)

References

Cities and towns in Birbhum district
Townships in India